Borisovskoye is a rural locality (a selo) in Pavlovskoye Rural Settlement, Suzdalsky District, Vladimir Oblast, Russia. The population was 646 as of 2010. There are 23 streets.

Geography 
Borisovskoye is located on the Pokolyayka River, 19 km south of Suzdal (the district's administrative centre) by road. Poretskoye is the nearest rural locality.

References 

Rural localities in Suzdalsky District
Vladimirsky Uyezd